Cesare Marullo (died 12 November 1588) was a Roman Catholic prelate who served as Archbishop of Palermo (1577–1588) and Bishop of Agrigento (1574–1577).

Biography
On 14 July 1574, Cesare Marullo was appointed by Pope Gregory XIII as Bishop of Agrigento.
On 11 September 1577, he was appointed by Pope Gregory XIII as Archbishop of Palermo. 
He served as Archbishop of Palermo until his death on 12 November 1588.

While bishop, he was the principal consecrator of Diego Haëdo, Bishop of Agrigento (1585).

References

External links and additional sources
 (for Chronology of Bishops) 
 (for Chronology of Bishops) 
 (for Chronology of Bishops)
 (for Chronology of Bishops) 

1588 deaths
16th-century Roman Catholic bishops in Sicily
Bishops appointed by Pope Gregory XIII
16th-century Italian Roman Catholic archbishops